is a Japanese Linux distribution sponsored by VineCaves. It has been a fork of Red Hat Linux 7.2 since Vine Linux 3.0. Work on Vine Linux was started in 1998.

All versions except Vine Seed have been announced to be discontinued from May 4, 2021.

Release history

References

External links 
  

RPM-based Linux distributions
Japanese-language Linux distributions
X86-64 Linux distributions
PowerPC operating systems
Linux distributions without systemd
Linux distributions